Inside the Torn Apart is the seventh studio album by British extreme metal band Napalm Death. It was released by Earache in June 1997 on double vinyl, regular CD, digipak CD and MC.

Track listing

Personnel

Napalm Death
Mark "Barney" Greenway – lead vocals
Jesse Pintado – lead guitar
Mitch Harris – rhythm guitar, backing vocals
Shane Embury – bass, backing vocals
Danny Herrera – drums

Technical personnel
 Colin Richardson – production
 Paul Siddens – recording engineering
 Andy Sneap – mix engineering
 Tony Wooliscroft – band photography
 Graham Humphreys – design, layout

References

Napalm Death albums
1997 albums
Earache Records albums